Olim Navkarov (born 3 March 1983) is an Uzbekistani footballer who currently plays for Olmaliq FK. His position is forward, he can play second striker.

Career
He had an offer from an Iranian side Foolad F.C., so he went to Iran for a trial at the club. He came back to Uzbekistan saying that he didn't like the conditions, and continued his career at Qizilqum Zarafshon.

Career statistics

International goals

References

External links
Player Profile Goal.com

1983 births
Living people
People from Navoiy Region
Uzbekistani footballers
Uzbekistan international footballers
2011 AFC Asian Cup players
FK Dinamo Samarqand players
Association football forwards